Despite fire hose and hydrant coupler standardization efforts that are at least 144 years old, there remain significant areas in Canada, the United States, and Mexico that use fire hose and hydrant threads and other couplings that are incompatible with those used by neighboring fire departments. This is notable because the first fire hydrant was invented by Manhattan fire fighter George Smith in 1817, making these devices 200 years old.

These incompatibilities have led to well-documented loss of life and buildings, including the Great Boston fire of 1872, the Great Baltimore Fire in 1904, and the Oakland firestorm of 1991. As of 2017, San Francisco still maintains fire hydrants with a size and thread that are incompatible with those used by most or all other nearby fire departments that would respond in mutual aid conditions, such as occurred during the 1989 Loma Prieta earthquake.

As a result of the 1872 Boston fire, the International Association of Fire Engineers designed and published a fire hydrant coupling standard. As a result of the 1904 Baltimore fire, the National Fire Protection Association formed a committee, and in 1905 published its first report on the subject, which would eventually become an official standard, NFPA 1963. This standard specified that each fire hydrant have one large diameter pumper (a.k.a. "steamer") port 4.5 inches in diameter with 4 threads per inch (meant for supplying water to a pumper truck or other high-capacity distribution device), and two medium-diameter ports, each 2.5 inches with 7.5 threads per inch, meant for supplying individual attack hoses directly.

During at least two periods, specialized thread-adjusting tool sets were developed to enable fire departments using diameters and threads similar to but incompatible with the NFPA standard to convert them to the national standard. The first of these was used around 1911, developed by the Greenfield Tap and Die Corporation, and documented as late as 1922, wherein it was claimed that the 70% of municipalities not already using the NFPA standard threads could convert their couplings to the new standard. Around 1950, San Diego Battalion Chief and Master Fire Mechanic Robert Ely developed a similar machine, now known as the “Ely Fire Hose Thread Standardizer" that could do the job in 90 seconds.

One of the reasons for the incompatibilities is that there are three U.S. national hose threaded hose coupling standards. NFPA 1963, which defines the vast majority of fire hose couplings in existence, and ANSI-ASME B1.20.7, which defines garden hose thread (sometimes used by wildland fire fighting crews) along with (non-tapered) iron pipe thread, and ANSI B26, FIRE-HOSE COUPLING SCREW THREAD FOR ALL CONNECTIONS HAVING NOMINAL INSIDE DIAMETERS OF 2 ½, 3, 3 ½, AND 4 ½ INCHES".

Note: the straight iron pipe thread is a temporary connection and seals with a gasket, just like garden hose threads and fire hose threads, and is distinct from tapered iron pipe thread (NPT), which is a permanent connection sealed by the threads in conjunction with pipe dope or teflon tape wrapped around the threads. However, because the straight and tapered iron pipe threads differ only in their taper, it is possible for small NPSH/SIPT female hose couplings in sizes ″ to 4″ (inclusive) to be joined to NPT male pipe ends. The connection uses a gasket to seal, and is temporary.

Abbreviations 
 National Hose Thread is abbreviated NH or NHT
 National Pipe Straight Hose is abbreviated NPSH (defined by ASME; same as SIPT, compatible with NPT threads when using a gasket)
 National Pipe Tapered Thread is abbreviated NPT or NPTF
 National Pipe Straight Mechanical is abbreviated NPSM
 Straight Iron Pipe Thread is abbreviated SIPT (same as NPSH)
 Garden Hose Thread is abbreviated GHT, but its official designation is NH (for National Hose, because it shares its origin with fire hose, but is no longer part of the fire hose coupler standard)
 General Iron Pipe Straight Thread is abbreviated IPS

NFPA 1963-Specified Metric Equivalents
 ″ hose/coupling = 19 mm
 1″ hose/coupling = 25 mm
 1″ hose/coupling = 38 mm
 2″ hose/coupling = 52 mm
 2″ hose/coupling = 65 mm
 3″ hose/coupling = 75 mm
 3″ hose/coupling = 90 mm
 4″ hose/coupling = 100 mm
 4″ hose/coupling = 114 mm
 5″ hose/coupling = 125 mm
 6″ hose/coupling = 150 mm
 8″ hose/coupling = 200 mm

Garden Hose

 ″ hose with ¾-11.5NH ASME threads (¾-11.5NHR for rolled threads)
 ″ hose with ¾-11.5NH ASME threads (¾-11.5NHR for rolled threads)
 ″ hose with ¾-11.5NH ASME threads (¾-11.5NHR for rolled threads)

Booster Hose
According to NFPA 1963, all nozzles used on booster hose shall have the 1-8 NH standard thread.
 ″ hose with ½-14NPSH ASME threads
 ″ hose with ¾-14NPSH ASME threads
 ″ hose with 0.75-8 NH NFPA threads (NFPA 1963 requirement)
 ″ hose with 1-8 NH NFPA threads (NFPA 1963 requirement)
 1″ hose with 1-8 NH NFPA threads (NFPA 1963 requirement; a.k.a. "Chemical Hose Thread" and "Booster Hose Thread"; the chemical hose thread term likely originates from its use on chemical fire engines, an early firefighting device used from 1872 until the 1930s that used a combination of bicarbonate of soda and sulfuric acid to force water from the tank into the hose). The 1933 report of the National Screw Thread Commission mentions ″ hose and 1″ hose on the same line, labeling them "Chemical engine and booster hose", with the other sizes labeled "Fire-protection hose".
 1″ hose with 1-11.5NPSH ASME threads
 1″ hose with 1¼-11.5NPSH ASME threads
 1″ hose with 1.5-9 NH NFPA threads (NFPA 1963 requirement, but not commonly used in the U.S. or Canada)
 1″ hose with 1½-11.5NPSH ASME threads instead of NFPA threads in the U.S. and Canada, without any regulation specifying its use, and contrary to NFPA 1963. This is perhaps a direct result of the 1918 War Industries Board recommendation noted above, combined with 1″ 1.5-9 NH NFPA couplings not being standardized until 1957.
 1″ with 1.5-9 NH NFPA threads (NFPA 1963 requirement)

Forestry Hose
The following hose and coupler combinations are used in U.S. wildland fire fighting.
 ″ hose with ¾-11.5NH ASME threads (Garden Hose Thread)
 ″ hose with ¾-14NPSH ASME threads (USDA 5100-107d specification)
 ″ hose with Forestry Coupling (CAN/ULC-S551-13 specification and USDA 5100-192 specification)
 1″ hose with Forestry Coupling (CAN/ULC-S551-13 specification and USDA 5100-192 specification)
 1″ hose with 1-11.5NPSH ASME threads (USDA 5100-107d specification)
 1″ hose with 1-8 NH NFPA threads (NFPA 1963 requirement, a.k.a. Chemical Hose Thread)
 1″ hose with 1½-11.5NPSH ASME threads (USDA 5100-107d specification)
 1″ hose with 1.5-9 NH NFPA threads (USDA 5100-107d specification and NFPA 1963 requirement, but not in common use)
 1″ hose with Forestry Coupling (CAN/ULC-S551-13 specification and USDA 5100-192 specification)
 2″ hose with 1½-11.5NPSH ASME threads (USDA 5100-107d specification, but not in common use)
 2″ hose with 2½-8NPSH ASME threads (USDA 5100-107d specification, but not in common use)
 2″ hose with 2.5-7.5 NH NFPA threads (USDA 5100-107d specification and NFPA 1963 requirement)
 2″ hose with Forestry Coupling (USDA 5100-192 specification, but only in use near the Canadian border)
 4″ hose with 4.5-4 NH NFPA threads

Attack Line Hose
 2″ hose with 2.5-7.5 NH NFPA threads (NFPA 1963 requirement)
 3″ hose with 2.5-7.5 NH NFPA threads (NFPA 1963 requirement)
 3″ hose with 3-6 NH NFPA threads (not commonly used in the U.S.)
 3″ hose with 3-8NPSH ASME threads
 3″ hose with 3.5-6 NH NFPA threads (NFPA 1963 requirement)
 3″ hose with 3½-8NPSH ASME threads

Fire Hydrant Ports
According to NFPA 1963, all U.S. fire hydrants should have the following ports:
 2″ attack port with 2.5-7.5 NH threads (two ports per hydrant; NFPA 1963 requirement)
 4″ pumper (steamer) port with either 4.5-4 NH threads or a 5-inch Storz port (one port per hydrant; NFPA 1963 requirement)

Suction Hose
Standard length is 10 feet. Normal flat hoses can't be used for suction because they would collapse; instead, these hoses are made of hard rubber with internal metal reinforcement or corrugated (scalloped) plastic. Additionally, suction hose requires the use of suction gaskets to prevent air from entering, which are not used on other types of hoses, which use gaskets that seal with the addition of water pressure (and sometimes leak when not enough pressure is present).
 2″ attack port with 2.5-7.5 NH threads
 Used as a secondary suction port on most fire engines, when the volume provided by a larger diameter hose is not needed but the flexibility of a smaller hose is
 4″ hose with 4″ Storz (100 mm) couplings
 5″ hose with 5″ Storz (125 mm) couplings
 Commonly carried on U.S. fire engines to pull water from fire hydrants for distribution with the engine's on-board pump. Some of these hoses will have Storz to 4.5-4 NH thread adapters (often with wide handles) already connected to them, in order to facilitate connection to fire hydrants without Storz ports (likely the vast majority of hydrants in the U.S.)

Supply Line Hose
 4″ hose with 4-4 NH NFPA threads (NFPA 1963 requirement)
 4″ hose with 4″ Storz (100 mm) couplings (allowed by NFPA 1963)
 4″ hose with 4.5-4 NH NFPA threads
 4″ hose with 4-8NPSH ASME threads
 5″ hose with 5-4 NH NFPA threads (NFPA 1963 requirement)
 5″ hose with 5″ Storz (125 mm) couplings (allowed by NFPA 1963)
 6″ hose with 6-4 NH NFPA threads (NFPA 1963 requirement, but not commonly used in the U.S.)
 8″ hose with 8-4 NH NFPA threads (NFPA 1963 requirement, but not commonly used in the U.S.; only added to NFPA 1963 in the 2003 edition)
Non-standard hose couplings

The fire hose threads that don't conform to NFPA 1963 or ULC-S551-13 include:
 1″ NPSH threads (used in Canada and the U.S.)
 1″ BSP (British Standard Pipe Thread; OD: 1.882″; pitch: 11)
 1″ NST (NH and NST and ANSI thread; OD: 1.990″; pitch: 11)
 2" Underwriter Tip (OD: 2.187″; TPI: 8)
 2″ BCST (British Columbia Standard Thread; OD: 2.990″; pitch: 8)
 2″ Ontario (Canadian Standards Association; OD: 3.125″; pitch: 5)
 2″ Nova Scotia - zone 1 (OD: 3.234″; pitch: 5)
 2″ QST and QMT Quebec/Montreal Combination Thread (OD: 3.031″; pitch: 7)
 2″ Sask. & Manitoba (Western Canada Fire Underwriters Association; OD: 3.250″; pitch: 6)
 2″ BSP (British Standard Pipe Thread; OD: 2.956″; pitch 11)
 2″ NST (NH and NST and ANSI thread; OD: 3.068″; pitch: 7.5)
 3″ Cincinnati, OH (OD: 3.078″; TPI: 6)
 3″ Cleveland, OH (OD: 3.062″, TPI: 8)
 3″ Pittsburgh, PA (OD: 3.062″; TPI: 6)
 3″ Detroit, MI (OD: 3.125″; TPI: 7.5)
 3″ Denver, CO (OD: 3.092″; TPI: 8)
 3″ Omaha, NE (OD: 3.078″; TPI 8)
 3″ Salt Lake City, UT (OD: 3.250″; TPI: 8)
 3″ Toledo, OH (OD: 3.000″, TPI: 8)

In addition, these major U.S. areas have their own standards (sometimes two standards per city) for ″ through 6″ fire hose threads:
 Eastern Hose Thread
 New York Corporation
 New York City Fire Department
 Chicago Hose Thread (Crane Standard)
 Chicago Fire Department
 Pittsburgh Gauge Hose Thread
 Pacific Coast Thread
 was originally developed by Valley Foundry of Fresno, California. They were designed primarily as hose fittings used in the wine industries.

Timeline of Hose Coupling Design 
These are all of the major international fire hose couplings, in order of definition or first use.

Timeline of North American Fire Hose Coupler Standards 
The content in this table is based on a compilation of all the sources cited in this article, plus the NFPA Technical Committee Report of 1967, "Report of Committee on Fire Department Equipment".

ANSI/ASME B1.7M-1984

ASME B1.7-2006: Screw Threads: Nomenclature, Definitions, and Letter Symbols.

Standards
 ANSI/ASME B1.20.7-1991
 ANSI B26
 NFPA 1901
 NFPA 1963 (old name NFPA 194)
 NFPA 1964 Spray Nozzles
 USDA Specification 5100-107d: "USDA Forest Service Specification for Fire Hose Connections and Fittings"
 USDA 5100-192 (19 mm, 25 mm, 38 mm, and 64 mm hose sizes.)
 CAN/ULC-S551-13 (25 mm and 38 mm forged couplers)
 CAN/ULC-S558-13 (25 mm and 38 mm non-forged couplers)
 UL 19 Standard for Lined Fire Hose and Hose Assemblies

See also
 NFPA 1901
 Fire hose
 Fire hydrant
 Hose coupling
 Hard suction hose
 Fire hose
 Fire hydrant
 Storz

References

External links
 http://www.onestopfire.com/threads.htm Thread Standards
 http://bestfireco.com/cart/fire-hose-fittings-nozzles-and-couplings-c-30_31.html Nozzles & Couplings

Hoses